The 2016 Melanesian Championships in Athletics took place on 7–9 July 2016. The event was held at the ANZ National Stadium in Suva, Fiji.

Participation

Medal summary

Men

Women

Medal table

References

External links
 Results
 Medal table

Melanesian Championships in Athletics
Melanesian Championships in Athletics
2016 in Fijian sport
July 2016 sports events in Oceania